Kasapis is a surname. Notable people with the surname include:

Gus Kasapis (born 1942), Canadian football player
Michalis Kasapis (born 1971), Greek footballer
Theodoros Kasapis (1835–1897), Ottoman Greek newspaper editor and educator

See also
Kasapi (surname)